Stoke Edith railway station was a station in Tarrington, Herefordshire, England. The station served the nearby village of Stoke Edith, was opened in 1861 and closed in 1965.

References

Further reading

Disused railway stations in Herefordshire
Railway stations in Great Britain opened in 1861
Railway stations in Great Britain closed in 1965
Former Great Western Railway stations
Beeching closures in England